The Balanchine (sometimes known as the Balanchine Stakes), is a horse race run over a distance of 1,800 metres (nine furlongs) on turf in February or March at Meydan Racecourse in Dubai. The race is named after Balanchine, a horse who won The Oaks and the Irish Derby in 1994. The race is restricted to female racehorses aged at least four years old, although three-year-olds bred in the southern hemisphere are also qualified.

It was first contested in 2004 at Nad Al Sheba Racecourse before being transferred to Meydan in 2010.

The Balanchine began as an ungraded race before being elevated to Listed class in 2006. The race was promoted to Group 3 level in 2009 and became a Group 2 event in 2011.

Records
Record time:
1:48.58 - Sajjhaa 2013

Most wins by a jockey:
 4 - Christophe Soumillon 2010, 2011, 2012, 2015

Most wins by a trainer:
 5 - Charlie Appleby 2019, 2020, 2021, 2022, 2023
 5 - Mike de Kock 2005, 2006, 2008, 2011, 2012

Most wins by an owner:
 9 - Godolphin Racing 2004, 2013, 2016, 2018, 2019, 2020, 2021, 2022, 2023

Winners

See also
 List of United Arab Emirates horse races

References

Horse races in the United Arab Emirates
Recurring events established in 2004
Nad Al Sheba Racecourse
2004 establishments in the United Arab Emirates